is a Japanese professional footballer who plays as a forward for Fujieda MYFC.

Career statistics

Club
.

Notes

References

External links

1996 births
Living people
Sportspeople from Tokyo Metropolis
Association football people from Tokyo Metropolis
Sanno Institute of Management alumni
Japanese footballers
Association football forwards
J3 League players
Azul Claro Numazu players
Fujieda MYFC players